Stella Dallas is a 1937 American drama film based on the 1923 Olive Higgins Prouty novel of the same name. It was directed by King Vidor and stars Barbara Stanwyck, John Boles and Anne Shirley. The film was nominated for Academy Awards for Best Actress in a Leading Role and Best Actress in a Supporting Role.

The film is the second film adaptation of the novel; the first was a 1925 silent film. The film was remade in 1990 as Stella. In February 2020, the film was shown at the 70th Berlin International Film Festival during a retrospective of Vidor's career.

Plot
Stella Martin, the daughter of a mill worker in a post-World War I Massachusetts factory town, is determined to better herself. She sets her sights on mill executive Stephen Dallas and catches him at an emotionally vulnerable time. Stephen's father killed himself after losing his fortune. Penniless, Stephen disappeared from high society, intending to marry his fiancée, Helen Morrison, once he was financially able to support her. However, just as he reaches his goal, he reads in the newspaper the announcement of her wedding. So he marries Stella.

A year later, their daughter, Laurel, is born. To Stella's great surprise, she discovers she has a strong maternal instinct. Even when she is out dancing and partying, she cannot help but think about her child. As Laurel grows up, Stella's ambition and scheming to rise socially is redirected to her daughter.

Stephen dotes on Laurel as well, but she is the only bond between husband and wife. He tries to help Stella become more refined, but without success. He also strongly disapproves of her continuing friendship with the vulgar Ed Munn. Finally, when Stephen receives a promotion that requires him to move to New York, Stella tells him he can go without her or Laurel; they separate, but remain married. Laurel stays with her mother, but visits her father periodically.

Years later, Stephen runs into Helen, now a wealthy widow with three sons. They renew their acquaintance. Laurel is invited to stay at Helen's mansion; she gets along very well with Helen and her sons. Stephen asks Stella for a divorce, but she turns him down.

Stella takes Laurel to a fancy resort, where Laurel meets Richard Grosvenor III, and they fall in love. However, when Stella makes her first appearance after recovering from an illness, she becomes the target of derision for her vulgarity, though she herself is unaware of it. Embarrassed for her mother, Laurel insists they leave at once without telling her why. On the train back, Stella overhears the truth.

Stella goes to talk with Helen. After learning that Helen and Stephen would marry if they could, she agrees to a divorce and asks that Laurel go live with them. Helen realizes the reason for the request and agrees.

When Laurel learns of the arrangement, she refuses to put up with it and returns home. However, Stella has been notified by a telegram and is ready for her. Stella pretends that she wants Laurel off her hands so she can marry Ed Munn and travel to South America. Laurel runs crying back to her father.

Later, Laurel and Richard get married. Stella watches them exchange their wedding vows from the city street through a window. Her presence goes unnoticed in the darkness and among the other curious bystanders. She then slips away in the rain, alone but triumphant in having arranged her daughter's happiness.

Cast
 Barbara Stanwyck as Stella Dallas, née Martin
 John Boles as Stephen Dallas
 Anne Shirley as Laurel Dallas
 Barbara O'Neil as Helen Morrison, later Helen Dallas
 Alan Hale as Ed Munn
 Marjorie Main as Mrs. Martin, Stella's mother
 Tim Holt as Richard Grosvenor III
 George Walcott as Charlie Martin
 Lillian Yarbo as Gladys (uncredited)

Production
Tim Holt, the son of Jack Holt, had his first proper part in a film with Stella Dallas. He played the same role that was performed by another film star's son, Douglas Fairbanks Jr., in the 1925 version.

Reception

Critical response 
In a contemporary review for The New York Times, critic Frank S. Nugent wrote that the character of Stella Dallas, first portrayed on the screen 12 years earlier, was outdated but that the film's theme of motherly love endured: "[W]e cannot accept Stella Dallas in 1937. She is a caricature all the way. ... Stella, through the years, was changeless, but, where her daughter was concerned, she was eternal: the selfless mother." Nugent praised Stanwyck's performance: "Miss Stanwyck's portrayal is as courageous as it is fine. Ignoring the flattery of make-up man and camera, she plays Stella as Mrs. Prouty drew her—coarse, cheap, common ... And yet magnificent as a mother."

Variety praised the film but mentioned some inconsistencies, such as the fact that Stella and her daughter both wear clothes made by Stella but that the daughter is always dressed in good taste while the mother is not.

Maclean's criticized the outlandish costumes worn by the title character but praised the story as relevant for any decade, concluding that "the picture is handled with honesty, restraint and feeling."

The film holds an 89% approval rating at Rotten Tomatoes based on ten reviews.

Accolades 

The character Stella Dallas was nominated for inclusion on the American Film Institute's 2003 list AFI's 100 Years...100 Heroes & Villains, and is considered by many as among Stanwyck's signature roles. Japanese filmmaker Akira Kurosawa cited Stella Dallas as one of his favorite films.

References

Further reading
 Williams, Linda. "'Something Else besides a Mother': 'Stella Dallas' and the Maternal Melodrama," Cinema Journal Vol. 24, No. 1 (Autumn, 1984), pp. 2–27 in JSTOR
 Stevenson, Diane. "Three Versions of Stella Dallas" for Jeffrey Crouse (editor), Film International, Issue 54, Volume, 9. Number 6 (2011), pp. 30–40.

External links

 
 
 
 

1937 films
1937 drama films
1930s English-language films
American drama films
American black-and-white films
Films about social class
Films based on American novels
Films directed by King Vidor
Films scored by Alfred Newman
Films set in Massachusetts
Samuel Goldwyn Productions films
Sound film remakes of silent films
United Artists films
1930s American films